Georgios Zisis (born 23 April 1999) is a Greek professional footballer who plays as a centre-back for Super League 2 club Ierapetra.

References

1999 births
Living people
Greek footballers
Greece youth international footballers
Super League Greece players
Super League Greece 2 players
Football League (Greece) players
Asteras Tripolis F.C. players
Aiginiakos F.C. players
Anagennisi Giannitsa F.C. players
Episkopi F.C. players
O.F. Ierapetra F.C. players
Association football defenders
Footballers from Kalamata